Kanokpon Buspakom (born 20 September 1999) is a Thai professional footballer who plays as a defensive midfielder for Thai League 1 club BG Pathum United.

International career
Kanokpon was part of Thailand U19's squad that competed in the 2018 Hassanal Bolkiah Trophy.

Honours

Club
BG Pathum United
 Thailand Champions Cup: 2022

Personal life
Kanokpon is the son of former footballer and coach Attaphol Buspakom and younger brother of footballer Wannaphon Buspakom.

References

1999 births
Living people
Kanokpon Buspakom
Kanokpon Buspakom
Kanokpon Buspakom
Association football midfielders
Kanokpon Buspakom
Kanokpon Buspakom
Kanokpon Buspakom
Kanokpon Buspakom